The Grand Prix Club is a club for philatelists who have won a Grand Prix award of any kind from a Fédération Internationale de Philatélie accredited philatelic exhibition.

Presidents of the club
1979 to 1982 Miroslaw A. Bojanowicz RDP
1982 to 1986 Gary S. Ryan RDP
1986 to 1989 John H. Levett RDP
1989 to 1992 Saverio Imperato
1992 to 1994 Christian C. Sundman RDP
1994 to 1996 Rolf-Dieter Jaretzky RDP
1996 to 2000 Robert P. Odenweller RDP
2000 to 2011 David J. Springbett RDP
2011 to current Tay Peng Hian RDP

References

Further reading
Springbett, D. (2001) The Grand Prix Club Book: 1950-2000. Geneva: David Feldman.

External links
Grand Prix Club newsletters Archived here.

Philatelic organizations